Islam Medical College (abbreviated as IMC), established in 2010, is a private college of medicine located on Pasroor Road, Sialkot, Punjab, Pakistan. It is registered with Pakistan Medical commission. PMC, affiliated with UHS and approved by Ministry of Health. Islam Teaching Hospital and Islam Central Hospital are attached to the college as training and teaching hospitals. The college enrolls 150 students for 5 year MBBS each year. Islam Medical College offers admissions in MBBS,BDS and DPT each year.

Campus

The college has two campuses. The main campus is in Sialkot  Islam medical college which is ranked  B by Pakistan medical commission
The second campus is M. Islam medical and dental college is situated in Gujranwala, Established in 2017 is ranked A by PMC

History
We started Islam Central Hospital to give specialized care in the private sector. It turned out to be a great success. In 2010, we decided to make a medical college. The college commences its activities with the enrollment of 100 students in the 1st batch 2010.Islam Medical College is recognized by the PMDC to intake 150 students annually. Since inception, the college has undergone tremendous development and became a splendid center for learning and development.

We continue to evaluate and improve our program to ensure the best medical education for the students. Our educational strategy is to create a conducive to learning environment and to steer our students to acquire adequate knowledge, skills and temperament to practice medicine and be a competent health care professional group.

College Building
Islam Medical College is composed of three buildings, an administration block, basic subjects block, and clinical subjects block. 
Islam Medical College (IMC) main academic campus is situated in a recently constructed, custom built structure in the heart of Punjab, Sialkot. The campus is spread over a sprawling area of 20 acres. It houses attractive modern Air-conditioned lecture theaters, dissection halls and laboratories for various basic subjects like Pathology, Anatomy, Biochemistry, Physiology, Pharmacology, and Histology.

The Radiology includes X – Ray Machines, CT Scan Mammography, Ultrasound colored Doppler and Fluoroscopy. The college has a very impressive Anatomy Museum, Pathology Museum, Forensic Medicine Museum and Community Medicine Museum which are amongst the best in the country. The campus also includes a well-developed, modernized library, information technology department

Hospitals
The college has two hospitals.
Islam teaching hospital is  a 350-bed hospital in campus for early clinical experience. It is staffed by doctors, nurses and paramedical staff. It provides clinical training to medical students 
The second hospital is Islam central hospital a 150-bed hospital located in the heart of the city for clinical training.

Hostels

The hostels are located inside the main campus. Hostels are separated by gender. Each hostel is staffed with wardens, cooks, bearers, chowkidars and cleaners. Along with the aforementioned, female hostels have additional housekeepers, washerwomen, and special security guards. Residing in the college hostel is not mandatory.

Transport

To the students not residing in the college hostel, The college also provides transport. The college transport system consists of buses, coasters and vans.

Education

The medical education at IMC is a five-year curriculum leading to the MBBS degree, the equivalent of the basic M.D degree in the United States, Europe, and the Middle East. The curriculum covers basic and clinical medical sciences. Students learn in a small-class environment as opposed to a large class environment so that ideally they will have more interaction time with their professors. In conjunction with the curriculum, students are encouraged to engage in research to refine their skills as well as to gain the most from their education. Guest speakers such as medical personalities, scientists, literary persons and military officers are invited on a weekly basis to give lectures to expose students to fields of work in the medical profession. Medical camps are held regularly so that students may travel to rural areas within a 50-kilometre radius to gather information and offer guidance to the community. These medical camps provide an extensive amount of social interaction which prepare students for clinical training.

Admission

Applicants who pass the F. Sc (Pre-Medical) Examination or a foreign equivalent with marks of at least 60% are eligible for admission. Admission is not restricted to any gender, nationality or religious affiliation. An aptitude test to gauge knowledge in English, Biology, Chemistry, and Physics is administered to applicants who meet the academic requirement. Candidates are then selected on merit, based on their entry test marks, F.Sc marks, aptitude entry and interview marks.

Affiliations

The college is recognized by PMC and UHS, Internationally the college is recognized by FAIMER GMC General medicine council.

External links
 
 Profile at IMED.
 Listed in Dmoz Pakistan

Medical colleges in Punjab, Pakistan
2010 establishments in Pakistan